The Dakota Club Library in Eagle Butte, South Dakota, also known as the Eagle Butte Library, was built in 1910.  It was listed on the National Register of Historic Places in 2004.

It is a sod building with a fieldstone veneer, on a stone foundation.  It has a balloon frame addition to the rear, also with a fieldstone veneer, which is larger than the original building, and which forms a T-shape.

References

Sod buildings and structures
National Register of Historic Places in Dewey County, South Dakota
Library buildings completed in 1910
Libraries on the National Register of Historic Places in South Dakota
Works Progress Administration in South Dakota